Morup Namgyal is an Indian folk musician, composer and dramatist, known for his contributions for the revival of Ladakhi and Tibetan folk music tradition. He is reported to have traveled across the Ladakhi region in the 1960s and documented the songs of the region which has assisted in the preservation of the regional musical tradition. He is one of the founders of Lamdon Social Welfare Society and Lamdon School, a not-for-profit institution promoting the cultural heritage of Ladakh. Noted as an active figure in Ladakhi society, he is a member of the advisory board of the Ladakh Arts and Media Organisation (LAMO). and has contested in the Assembly Elections from the Lingshed constituency, though unsuccessfully. The Government of India awarded him the fourth highest civilian honour of the Padma Shri, in 2004, for his contributions to Indian music. His life has been made into a documentary, The Song Collector, directed by Erik Koto.

See also 
 Ladakh
 Tsering Landol

References

External links 
 
 

1947 births
Living people
People from Leh district
Dramatists and playwrights from Jammu and Kashmir
Indian male folk singers
Indian male dramatists and playwrights
Indian male composers
Musicians from Jammu and Kashmir
Recipients of the Padma Shri in arts